Cometary Orbital Drive to 2199 is an album by Acid Mothers Temple & the Melting Paraiso U.F.O. released by Nod and Smile in 2013 which includes three new versions of "Cometary Orbital Drive," a song they often perform live.

The album was released on CD and vinyl double LP, with both formats limited to 500 copies each.

Track listing

Personnel
 Tsuyama Atsushi – bass
 Shimura Koji – drums
 Higashi Hiroshi – synthesizer
 Tabata Mitsuru – guitar, guitar synthesizer
 Kawabata Makoto – guitar, makototronics

Additional Personnel
 Yamamoto Seiichi – guitar on Cometary Orbital Drive To 2200

Technical personnel
 Kawabata Makoto – production, engineering and mixing
 Yoshida Tatsuya – engineering on Cometary Orbital Drive To 2200
 Yoshida Tatsuya – digital mastering
 Niko Potočnjak – artwork

References

Acid Mothers Temple albums
2013 albums